The Pampa News is a daily newspaper published in Pampa, Texas, United States. It covers Pampa and the surrounding areas of Gray County, Texas.

The paper is published daily except Sundays and major holidays. The daily circulation is about 3,600.

See also
Pampa, Texas
List of newspapers in Texas

References

External links
 The Pampa News
 Vocus, Inc: Texas’ Pampa News announces editor

Pampa News
Pampa, Texas micropolitan area
Gray County, Texas